Tun Mohamed Zahir bin Ismail (19 March 1924 – 14 October 2004) was a Malaysian lawyer and politician who served as Speaker of the Dewan Rakyat, the lower chamber of the Malaysian Parliament from June 1982 to his death in October 2004. He was the longest-serving officeholder by serving for 22 years, 4 months. He was also the first Chancellor of the International Medical University from 1999 to 2004.

Early life and education
Mohamed Zahir was born in Alor Setar, Kedah. He attended Sekolah Kebangsaan Hosba in Jitra and later Kolej Sultan Abdul Hamid, Alor Setar. He obtained his Bachelor of Laws from Lincoln's Inn in 1955.

Career
Mohamed Zahir began practising as a lawyer from 1956. After the independence of Malaya, he served as the Kedah State EXCO from 1959 to 1963, and briefly as Menteri Besar in 1963. He was appointed to the Dewan Negara (the upper house) in August 1963, and completed two terms (of three years each) as a Senator.

He was actively involved in the formation of the Malaysia, serving as a diplomat to the United Nations and as the Malayan representative to the Cobbold Commission. In 1975, he was appointed to the Kota Bharu High Court as a judge.

Now a respected figure in Malaysian politics, he was elected Speaker of the Dewan Rakyat following the 1982 general elections, a post he held for 22 years. During his tenure, he also became President of the Commonwealth Parliamentary Association, Asia Pacific Parliamentary Forum and the ASEAN Inter Parliamentary Assembly.

Death
In October 2004, Mohamed Zahir died in office due to acute renal failure in Kuala Lumpur Hospital. He was laid to rest beside the grave of his wife, Toh Puan Halimatun Saadiah Chik, at the Section 21 Muslim burial ground in Shah Alam, Selangor.

Honours

Honours of Malaysia
  : 
  Companion of the Order of the Defender of the Realm (JMN) (1963)
  Malaysian Commemorative Medal (Silver) (PPM) (1965)
  Commander of the Order of the Defender of the Realm (PMN) – Tan Sri (1984)
  Grand Commander of the Order of Loyalty to the Crown of Malaysia (SSM) – Tun (1998)
  :
  Knight Grand Commander of the Order of the Crown of Kelantan (SPMK) – Dato' (1975)
  :
  Knight Grand Companion of the Order of Loyalty to the Royal House of Kedah (SSDK) – Dato' Seri (2002)

References

Others
Dalam lembut Tun Mohamed tetap tegas MyKMU Net (from Berita Harian) Accessed 7 June 2010.

Speakers of the Dewan Rakyat
Members of the Kedah State Legislative Assembly
Kedah state executive councillors
Members of the Dewan Negara
1924 births
2004 deaths
Deaths from kidney failure
People from Kedah
Malaysian people of Malay descent
Malaysian Muslims
United Malays National Organisation politicians
Members of Lincoln's Inn
20th-century Malaysian judges
Grand Commanders of the Order of Loyalty to the Crown of Malaysia
Commanders of the Order of the Defender of the Realm
Companions of the Order of the Defender of the Realm
Academic staff of the International Medical University